Robin C. Sickles is an American economist.

Life and work
He has worked extensively in modeling productivity and efficiency and health outcomes and risk factors that impact health. His research provides new methodological approaches to model and measure complicated economic behaviors and outcomes. His work also focuses on the role that econometrics plays in policy issues, such as market regulation, market transition, and deterrence versus preventive measures in the criminal justice system. After graduating from Georgia Institute of Technology in 1972 (B.S., Economics), he earned a Ph.D. in Economics in 1976 from the University of North Carolina, Chapel Hill. He is the Reginald Henry Hargrove Chair in Economics Emeritus and Professor Statistics Emeritus at Rice University. He is a Fellow of the Journal of Econometrics and the International Association of Applied Econometrics, has served as the Editor-in-Chief for the Journal of Productivity Analysis, and has held positions as Associate Editor for the Journal of Econometrics, Journal of Business and Economic Statistics, Journal of Applied Econometrics, and Empirical Economics, among others. He has co-authored and edited eleven books, volumes, journal special issues  related to applied econometric topics, over 100 articles in peer-reviewed journals, and over 50 chapters in handbooks and other volumes. His most recent major work is Measurement of Productivity and Efficiency: Theory and Practice ( with Valentin Zelenyuk. New York: Cambridge University Press, 2019.)

Publications 
He has authored and/or edited 11 books, volumes and special issues, published in journals such as Econometrica, Journal of Econometrics, Journal of Applied Econometrics, Review of Economics and Statistics, American Economic Review, International Economic Review, Journal of Business and Economic Statistics, Journal of Labor Economics, The Economic Journal and Journal of Human Resources, among others. Some of his most recent and prominent publications are:

Academic and editorial work 
 He is a Fellow of the International Association of Applied Econometrics
 He is a Fellow of the Journal of Econometrics
 He is a Founding President of the International Society for Efficiency and Productivity Analysis
 He is a Member of the Conference on Research in Income and Wealth, National Bureau of Economic Research
 In 2008 he was listed in top 100 econometricians in the world ranked by the number of all econometric articles, 1989–2005 in WORLDWIDE ECONOMETRICS RANKINGS: 1989-2005 (Badi H. Baltagi, Econometric Theory)
 He served as the Editor-in-Chief for the Journal of Productivity Analysis from 2002 to 2012.
 He served as an Associate Editor/ Editorial Board member for the Journal Of Econometrics (2000-2019).
 He served as an Associate Editor for the Journal of Business and Economics Statistics (1998-2007)
 He served as an Associate Editor for Empirical Economics (2000-2019)

References

External links 
 https://www.amazon.in/Productivity-Inequality-Springer-Proceedings-Economics/dp/3319686771
 https://www.amazon.com/Causes-Correlates-Consequences-Death-Adults/dp/0792382862/ref=sr_1_4?crid=16DGXSPUUJH2Q&keywords=robin+Sickles&qid=1645745523&s=books&sprefix=robin+sickles%2Cstripbooks%2C139&sr=1-4
 https://www.amazon.com/Oxford-Handbook-Productivity-Analysis-Handbooks-ebook/dp/B07G81N6RK/ref=sr_1_5?crid=16DGXSPUUJH2Q&keywords=robin+Sickles&qid=1645745586&s=books&sprefix=robin+sickles%2Cstripbooks%2C139&sr=1-5
 https://www.amazon.com/Oxford-Handbook-Productivity-Analysis-Handbooks-ebook/dp/B07G81N6RK/ref=sr_1_5?crid=16DGXSPUUJH2Q&keywords=robin+Sickles&qid=1645745586&s=books&sprefix=robin+sickles%2Cstripbooks%2C139&sr=1-5
 https://www.amazon.com/Advances-Efficiency-Productivity-Proceedings-Economics-ebook/dp/B08LMJT4GY/ref=sr_1_10?crid=16DGXSPUUJH2Q&keywords=robin+Sickles&qid=1645745685&s=books&sprefix=robin+sickles%2Cstripbooks%2C139&sr=1-10

21st-century American economists
Georgia Tech alumni
Living people
Microeconometricians
University of North Carolina alumni
Rice University faculty
Year of birth missing (living people)